Irregular Warfare Headquarters was an Irregular military unit of Iranian Armed Forces, active during Iran–Iraq War. The unit was established by Mostafa Chamran in 1979. After his death in 1981, Mehdi Chamran became commander of the unit for about nine months and it eventually was dissolved. Guerrillas fighting in this unit, later joined Islamic Revolutionary Guard Corps and Basij.

References 

Military units and formations established in 1979
1979 establishments in Iran
Military of Iran
Guerrilla organizations
Paramilitary organisations based in Iran